The 8th annual Nickelodeon Australian Kids' Choice Awards was held on Friday 8 October 2010 at the Sydney Entertainment Centre. Nomination entries closed on 1 August 2010 and the nominees for this year's season, were revealed on 15 August 2010. It was also revealed that Jessica Watson received the Nickelodeon Platinum Achievement award. Nickelodeon Australia rebranded during these Awards.

The Kids' Choice Awards was hosted by Liam Hemsworth, Jessica Mauboy and Jerry Trainor. There were live performances by Short Stack, Amy Meredith, Cody Simpson and Justice Crew.

Winners and nominees

Book
Best Book
 Twilight Series Winner 
 Tomorrow, When the War Began
 Harry Potter and the Deathly Hallows
 Diary of a Wimpy Kid

Music

Fresh Aussie Musos
 Amy Meredith
 Stan Walker
 Cody Simpson Winner
 Orianthi

Fave Aussie Musos
 Jessica Mauboy Winner
 Vanessa Amorosi
 Short Stack
 Guy Sebastian

Fave International Band
 Glee
 The Black Eyed Peas Winner
 Paramore
 Big Time Rush

Fave Song
 "Telephone" Lady Gaga featuring Beyoncé
 "California Gurls" - Katy Perry featuring Snoop Dogg Winner
 "TiK ToK" - Ke$ha
 "In My Head" - Jason Derulo

TV

Fave TV Show
 iCarly Winner
 Glee
 Wizards of Waverly Place
 Camp Orange: Castle Mountain

Fave TV Star
 Miranda Cosgrove (iCarly)
 Big Time Rush
 Hutch Dano (Zeke & Luther)
 Lea Michele (Glee)
 Selena Gomez (Wizards of Waverly Place) Winner

Fave Reality Show
 Camp Orange Winner
 The Biggest Loser Australia
 Australia's Got Talent
 MasterChef Australia

Top Toon
 SpongeBob SquarePants Winner
 The Simpsons
 Phineas and Ferb
 Avatar: The Last Airbender

People

The LOL Award
 Luke and Wyatt
 Hamish and Andy
 iCarly Cast Winner
 Shaun Micallef

Cutest Couple
 Zac Efron & Vanessa Hudgens Winner
 Miranda Kerr & Orlando Bloom
 Miley Cyrus & Liam Hemsworth
 Robert Pattinson & Kristen Stewart

Hottest Hottie
 Justin Bieber 
 Taylor Lautner Winner
 Rachael Finch
 Taylor Swift

Awesome Aussie
 Bindi Irwin
 Rove McManus Winner
 Tim Cahill
 Torah Bright

Platinum Achievement Award
 Jessica Watson

Big Kid Award
 Josh Thomas
 Luke and Wyatt
 Jerry Trainor
 Drake Bell Winner

Movies
Fave Animated Movie
 Open Season 3 Winner
 Shrek Forever After
 Toy Story 3
 How to train your Dragon

Favourite Movie Star
 Miley Cyrus Winner
 Kristen Stewart
 Robert Pattinson 
 Xavier Samuel

Fave Kiss
 Miley Cyrus & Liam Hemsworth - The Last Song Winner
 Kristen Stewart & Taylor Lautner - The Twilight Saga: Eclipse
 Kristen Stewart & Robert Pattinson - The Twilight Saga: Eclipse
 Taylor Lautner & Taylor Swift - Valentine's Day

References

External links
 Official website

Nickelodeon Kids' Choice Awards
2010 awards
2010 in Australian television
2010s in Sydney